The Synod of Tarnovo was a council of the Bulgarian Church, at that time in union with Rome, held at Veliko Tarnovo in 1211. Emperor (or Tsar) Boril of Bulgaria convoked it to condemn Bogomilism. The decisions of the synod were included in a document, now known as the Book of Boril.

References

Sources 

 
 

13th century in Bulgaria
Bogomilism
1211 in Europe